Vadim Berdnikov (born July 7, 1987) is a Russian professional ice hockey player who currently plays for Arlan Kokshetau of the Kazakhstan Hockey Championship (KHC).

References

External links

1987 births
Living people
Russian ice hockey forwards
Arlan Kokshetau players
Atlant Moscow Oblast players
Severstal Cherepovets players
HC Spartak Moscow players
Traktor Chelyabinsk players
HC Vityaz players